The 1999 Kazakhstan Cup Final was the seventh final of the Kazakhstan Cup. The match was contested by Kaisar-Hurricane and Vostok-Altyn at Central Stadium in Almaty. The match was played on 16 Jule 1999 and was the final match of the competition.

Background
Kaisar-Hurricane played the second Kazakhstan Cup Final. In the first final they lost Irtysh with the score 2–1.

Vostok-Altyn played the third Kazakhstan Cup Final. In a Kazakhstan Cup Final they have won against Aktyubinets (1994 final, 1–0) and have lost Kairat (1997 final, 2–0).

Kaisar-Hurricane and Vostok-Altyn played twice during the season of league. In the first game, on Jule 20, 1998 Vostok-Altyn won 2–0 on Vostok Stadium. As a part of Vostok-Altyn - Aleksandr Antropov and Vladimir Kashtanov scored. On August 4, 1998, Kaisar-Hurricane won a victory 2–0 with goals Andrei Vaganov and Azamat Niyazymbetov.

Route to the Final

Kaisar-Hurricane

Vostok-Altyn

Match

Details

References

1998 domestic association football cups
1998 in Kazakhstani football
1999 domestic association football cups
1999 in Kazakhstani football
Kazakhstan Cup Finals
Kazakhstan Cup Final 1998-99